Patricia Neal (born Patsy Louise Neal, January 20, 1926 – August 8, 2010) was an American actress of stage and screen. A major star of the 1950s and 1960s, she was the recipient of an Academy Award, a Golden Globe Award, a Tony Award, and two British Academy Film Awards, and was nominated for three Primetime Emmy Awards. Her most popular film roles were: World War II widow Helen Benson in The Day the Earth Stood Still (1951), radio journalist Marcia Jeffries in A Face in the Crowd (1957), wealthy matron Emily Eustace Failenson in Breakfast at Tiffany's (1961), and the worn-out housekeeper Alma Brown in Hud (1963), for which she won the Academy Award for Best Actress. She featured as the matriarch in the television film The Homecoming: A Christmas Story (1971); her role as Olivia Walton was re-cast for the series it inspired, The Waltons.

Early life and education
Neal was born in Packard, Whitley County, Kentucky, to William Burdette Neal and Eura Mildred (née Petrey) Neal. She had two siblings.

Neal grew up in Knoxville, Tennessee, where she attended Knoxville High School, and studied drama at Northwestern, where she was a member of Pi Beta Phi sorority. At Northwestern, she was crowned Syllabus Queen in a campus-wide beauty pageant.

Career
Neal gained her first job in New York as an understudy in the Broadway production of the John Van Druten play The Voice of the Turtle. Next, she appeared in Lillian Hellman's Another Part of the Forest (1946), winning the 1947 Tony Award for Best Featured Actress in a Play, in the first presentation of the Tony awards.

Neal made her film debut with Ronald Reagan in John Loves Mary, followed by another role with Reagan in The Hasty Heart, and then The Fountainhead (all 1949). The shooting of the last film coincided with her affair with her married co-star, Gary Cooper, with whom she worked again in Bright Leaf (1950).

Neal starred with John Garfield in The Breaking Point (1950), in The Day the Earth Stood Still (1951) with Michael Rennie, and in Operation Pacific (also 1951) starring John Wayne. She suffered a nervous breakdown around this time, following the end of her relationship with Cooper, and left Hollywood for New York, returning to Broadway in 1952 for a revival of The Children's Hour. In 1955, she starred in Edith Sommer's A Roomful of Roses, staged by Guthrie McClintic.

While in New York, Neal became a member of the Actors Studio. Based on connections with other members, she subsequently co-starred in the film A Face in the Crowd (1957, directed by Elia Kazan), the play The Miracle Worker (1959, directed by Arthur Penn), the film Breakfast at Tiffany's (1961), and the film Hud (1963), directed by Martin Ritt and starring Paul Newman. During the same period, she appeared on television in an episode of The Play of the Week (1960), featuring an Actors Studio-dominated cast in a double bill of plays by August Strindberg, and in a British production of Clifford Odets' Clash by Night (1959), which co-starred one of the first generation of Actors Studio members, Nehemiah Persoff.

Neal won the Academy Award for Best Actress for her performance in Hud (1963), co-starring with Paul Newman. When the film was initially released it was predicted she would be a nominee in the supporting actress category, but when she began collecting awards, they were always for Best Actress, from the New York Film Critics, the National Board of Review and a BAFTA award from the British Academy of Film and Television Arts.

Neal was re-united with John Wayne in Otto Preminger's In Harm's Way (1965), winning her second BAFTA Award. Her next film was The Subject Was Roses (1968), for which she was nominated for an Academy Award. She starred as the matriarch in the television film The Homecoming: A Christmas Story (1971), which inspired the television series The Waltons; she won a Golden Globe for her performance. In a 1999 interview with the Archive of American Television, Waltons creator Earl Hamner said he and producers were unsure if Neal's health would allow her to commit to the schedule of a weekly television series; so, instead, they cast Michael Learned in the role of Olivia Walton. Neal played a dying widowed mother trying to find a home for her three children in an episode of NBC's Little House on the Prairie broadcast in 1975.

Neal appeared in a series of television commercials in the 1970s, notably for pain relief medicine Anacin and Maxim instant coffee.

Neal played the title role in Robert Altman's movie Cookie's Fortune (1999). She worked on Silvana Vienne's movie Beyond Baklava: The Fairy Tale Story of Sylvia's Baklava (2007), appearing as herself in the portions of the documentary talking about alternative ways to end violence in the world. In the same year as the film's release, Neal received one of two annually-presented Lifetime Achievement Awards at the SunDeis Film Festival in Waltham, Massachusetts. (Academy Award nominee Roy Scheider was the recipient of the other.)

Having won a Tony Award in their inaugural year (1947) and eventually becoming the last surviving winner from that first ceremony, Neal often appeared as a presenter in later years. Her original Tony was lost, so she was given a surprise replacement by Bill Irwin when they were about to present the 2006 Tony Award for Best Performance by a Leading Actress in a Play to Cynthia Nixon. In April 2009, Neal received a lifetime achievement award from WorldFest Houston on the occasion of the debut of her film, Flying By. Neal was a long-term actress with Philip Langner's Theatre at Sea/Sail With the Stars productions with the Theatre Guild. In her final years she appeared in a number of health-care videos.

Neal was inducted into the American Theatre Hall of Fame in 2003. She was a subject of the British television show This Is Your Life in 1978 when she was surprised by Eamonn Andrews at a cocktail party on London's Park Lane.

Personal life

During the filming of The Fountainhead (1949), Neal began an affair with her married co-star Gary Cooper, whom she had met in 1947 when she was 21 and he was 46. At one point in their relationship, Cooper hit her in the face after he caught Kirk Douglas trying to seduce her. During this time, she was a Democrat who supported the campaign of Adlai Stevenson during the 1952 presidential election.

Neal met British writer Roald Dahl at a dinner party hosted by Lillian Hellman in 1952, while Dahl was living in New York. They married on July 2, 1953, at Trinity Church in New York. The marriage produced five children.
 Olivia Twenty (1955–1962);
 Chantal Sophia "Tessa" (born 1957), who became an author, and mother of author, cookbook writer and former model Sophie Dahl 
 Theo Matthew (born 1960);
 Ophelia Magdalena (born 1964);
 Lucy Neal (born 1965).
On December 5, 1960, their son Theo, four months old, suffered brain damage when his baby carriage was struck by a taxicab in New York City. In May 1961, the family returned to Gipsy House in Great Missenden, Buckinghamshire, where Theo continued his rehabilitation. Neal described the two years of family life during Theo's recovery as one of the most beautiful periods of her life. However, on November 17, 1962, their daughter Olivia died at age 7 from measles encephalitis. The story of Olivia's death and how Neal and Dahl coped with the tragedy was dramatized in 2020 as a made-for-TV movie, To Olivia.

Neal was a heavy smoker. She suffered three burst cerebral aneurysms while pregnant in 1965 and was in a coma for three weeks. Variety magazine ran an obituary, but she survived with the assistance of Dahl and a number of volunteers who developed a gruelling style of therapy which fundamentally changed the way that stroke patients were treated. This period of their lives was dramatised in the television film The Patricia Neal Story (1981), in which the couple were played by Glenda Jackson and Dirk Bogarde. She subsequently relearned to walk and talk and gave birth to a healthy daughter on August 4, 1965. After her recovery, she was nominated for an Oscar for her 1968 performance in The Subject Was Roses.

In 1983, following Dahl's 11-year affair with Felicity D'Abreu, a set designer he met when she worked with Neal on a Maxim Coffee advertisement, Neal's marriage ended in divorce. She returned to live in the US. In her autobiography, As I Am (1988), Neal wrote: "A strong positive mental attitude will create more miracles than any wonder drug."

Legacy
In 1978, Fort Sanders Regional Medical Center in Knoxville dedicated the Patricia Neal Rehabilitation Center in her honor. The center provides intense treatment for stroke, spinal cord, and brain injury patients. It serves as part of Neal's advocacy for paralysis victims. She regularly visited the center in Knoxville, providing encouragement to its patients and staff. Neal appeared as the center's spokeswoman in advertisements until her death.

Death
Neal died at her home in Edgartown, Martha's Vineyard, Massachusetts, on August 8, 2010, from lung cancer. She was 84 years old.

She had become a Catholic four months before she died and was buried in the Abbey of Regina Laudis in Bethlehem, Connecticut, where the actress Dolores Hart, her friend since the early 1960s, had become a nun and ultimately prioress. Neal had been a longtime supporter of the abbey's open-air theatre and arts program.

Filmography

Film

Television

Stage

Bibliography

References

External links

Patricia Neal papers at the University of Wisconsin's Actors Studio Audio collection
Patricia Neal profile at Allmovie
Patricia Neal interview on BBC Radio 4 Desert Island Discs, August 19, 1988

1926 births
2010 deaths
Actresses from Kentucky
Actresses from Tennessee
American expatriates in the United Kingdom
American film actresses
American television actresses
American health activists
Best Foreign Actress BAFTA Award winners
Best Actress Academy Award winners
Best Drama Actress Golden Globe (television) winners
Converts to Roman Catholicism from Anglicanism
Deaths from lung cancer in Massachusetts
Donaldson Award winners
Northwestern University School of Communication alumni
People from Knoxville, Tennessee
People from Whitley County, Kentucky
Tony Award winners
20th-century American actresses
21st-century American actresses
Warner Bros. contract players
People from Martha's Vineyard, Massachusetts
Dahl family
Kentucky Democrats
Tennessee Democrats
California Democrats
Massachusetts Democrats
Catholics from Massachusetts
Catholics from Tennessee
Catholics from Kentucky